Björg or Bjørg is a feminine given name of Old Norse origin: bjǫrg ‘protection. It is in use in Scandinavian countries, including Sweden, Norway and Iceland meaning "help, salvation." It is a popular middle name for girls born in Iceland. It was very common in Norway just before World War II, but it later lost its popularity in the country.

People with the name

First name
 Björg Hafsteinsdóttir (born 1969), Icelandic basketball player
 Bjørg Lødøen (1931–2009), Norwegian painter
 Björg Carítas Þorláksson (1874–1934), Icelandic scholar and teacher.
 Bjørg Vik (1935–2018), Norwegian writer

Middle name
 Hildur Björg Kjartansdóttir (born 1994), Icelandic basketball player
 Þóra Björg Helgadóttir (born 1981), Icelandic football player

Notes

Feminine given names